

History
The Commonwealth Coast Conference ice hockey tournament began in 2017 with eight of the ten teams qualifying for the postseason. The 2021 tournament was cancelled due to the COVID-19 pandemic.

2017

Note: * denotes overtime period(s)

2018

Note: * denotes overtime period(s)

2019

The championship game was played at the Portsmouth Abbey in Portsmouth, Rhode Island.

Note: * denotes overtime period(s)

2020

Note: * denotes overtime period(s)

2022

Note: * denotes overtime period(s)

2023

Note: * denotes overtime period(s)

Championships

See also
ECAC 2 TournamentECAC Northeast Tournament

References

Ice hockey
Commonwealth Coast Conference
Recurring sporting events established in 2017